James Charles Smith from the Utility Wind Integration Group, Kitty Hawk, NC was named Fellow of the Institute of Electrical and Electronics Engineers (IEEE) in 2013 for leadership in integration of wind energy sources into the electric power grid.

References 

Fellow Members of the IEEE
Living people
Year of birth missing (living people)
Place of birth missing (living people)